Thomás Aquino (born 26 April 1986) is a Brazilian actor. He became known for the films Curral, Bacurau and the series Boca a Boca by Netflix. He won the Festival de Cine Iberoamericano de Huelva in the Best Actor category in 2020.

Career 

He started his career in theater in 2006, acting in O Grande Circo Místico. His film debut was in 2013, in the movie Tatuagem. Also in 2013 he wrote and produced his first solo project called Processo de Tudo which was based on the book, "Nao se pode amar a ser Feliz ao mesmo Tempo" de Nelson Rodriguez. He made his musical debut in 2014 in "Opera de Malandro" by Chico Buarque and in "Gonzagoa- A Lenda" which were both directed by Joao Falcao. He started his film career with the short film "Urbanos" Allessandra Nilo, awarded as the best short film byFESTin- Festival de Lisboa. In 2020 he won Best Supporting Actor Award at the Gramado Festival for his work on the feature film "Todos os Mortos".   He also in 2020 he won the Best Actor award at the Festival de Cine Iberoamericano de Huelva for his performance in the film Curral.

Filmography

Movies

Television

Awards and nominations

References

External links
 

1986 births
Living people
Brazilian actors